This article is a list of historic places in the province of Alberta entered on the Canadian Register of Historic Places, whether they are federal, provincial, or municipal. The listings are divided by region.
List of historic places in Alberta's Rockies
List of historic places in the Calgary Region
List of historic places in Central Alberta
List of historic places in the Edmonton Metropolitan Region
List of historic places in Northern Alberta
List of historic places in Southern Alberta

See also 

 List of National Historic Sites of Canada in Alberta